The International Falcon Movement – Socialist Educational International (IFM-SEI) is an international non-profit organisation based in Belgium that campaigns for children's rights. It is a fraternal organisation of Socialist International and works closely with International Union of Socialist Youth (IUSY) and Young European Socialists (formerly ECOSY). IFM-SEI is a full member of the European Youth Forum (YFJ) which operates within the Council of Europe and European Union area and works closely with both these bodies. In Latin-America it is a full member of the Foro Latin-America de Juventud (FLAJ). It is also part of the International Coordination Meeting of Youth Organisations (ICMYO) which consists of worldwide active youth organisations and regional youth platforms coordinating their activities towards the UN and its agencies.

It has member organisations all over the world and is strongest in Europe and South America. Many of its member organisations work with children and young people of all ages through activities, groups and camping.

IFM-SEI members are children and youth self-organisations, family organisations and other organisations who are working for the benefit of children and young peoples.  IFM-SEI organise campaigns, for example against child labour or child pornography, seminars, trainings, camps and other educational activities. Their activities are carried out by member organisation, and international seminars are held regularly in cooperation with other fraternal organisations. A recent activity was the Peace Camp with Israelis and Palestinians. The LGBT event of IFM is called Queer Easter.

President 

 Max Winter from Rote Falken, (1925)
 Anton Tesarek from Rote Falken, (1955–1959)
 Hans Matzenauer from Rote Falken, (1967–1980)
 Eric Nielsen from DUI leg og virke, (1980–1983)
 Piet Kempenaars from (1983–1985)
 Eric Nilsson from Unga Örnar, (1985)
 Jerry Svensson from Unga Örnar, (1985–1995)
 Jessi Sörensen from DUI leg og virke, (1995–2001)
 Östen Lövgren from Unga Örnar, (2001–2005)
 Ted Birch from Unga Örnar,(2005–2007)
 Tim Scholz from SJD - Die Falken (2007–2013)
 Ana Maria Almario from Acacia Fundacion (2013–2016)
 Sylvia Siqueira Campos from Mirim (2016–2018)
 Christina Schauer from Kinderfreunde Rote Falken, (2018–2022)

Secretaries General 

 Kurt Biak from (Voluntary) (1931)
 Miguel Angel Martínez Martínez from (first full-time) (1966–1972)
 Ilpo Rossi from Nuoret Kotkat, (1972–1976)
 Ulric Andersen from Unga Örnar, (1976–1979)
 Jacqui Cottyn from (1979–1995)
 Odette Lambert from (1995–2001)
 Uwe Ostendorff from SJD - Die Falken (2001–2007)
 Tamsin Pearce from Woodcraft Folk, (2007–2013)
 Christine Sudbrock from (2013–2016)
 Carly Walker-Dawson from Woodcraft Folk, (2016–2020)
 Ruba Hilal from Independence Youth Union, (2020–present)

Current Presidium 

The Presidium is made up of the Secretary-General, President and two Presidium members from each region (Africa, Latin America, Middle East, Europe and Asia) to make a total of 12 members. Regional Representatives have one seat reserved for a woman and one seat reserved for a person under 30. The last elections were held in 2016.

 Ruba Hilal (Secretary General) from Independence Youth Union,
 Christina Schauer (President) from Kinderfreunde Rote Falken,
 Ellen Lindsey Awuku (Vice President) Association des Pionniers de Mali,
 Babacar Mahamadou Toure (Africa Presidium Member) Pionniers du Mali,
 Samvida Pandya (Asia Presidium Member) Antar Bharti,
 Nishaben Vasava  (Asia) Antar Bharati
 Wilhelmenia Seppä-Ojanperä (Europe Presidium Member) Nuoret Kotkat,
 Cesar Rivero (Latin America Presidium Member) Los Cachorros
 Deborah McCahon (Control Commission) Woodcraft Folk

Republics and Camps of the IFM-SEI 

There were four children's republics held by the international before World War II:
 1933 First Republic: Oostduinkerke,.
 1935 Second Republic: Verneuil-l'Étang,. 900 children from Austria, Belgium, Czechoslovakia, France, UK and Switzerland.
 1937 Third Republic: Brighton,. Theme: Solidarity, 2,000 participants from Belgium, Czechoslovakia, France, Britain, Spain and Tunisia.
 1939 Fourth Republic: Wandre,. Theme: Freedom and Peace, 1,600 participants, from Belgium, France, UK, Switzerland, Tunisia and refugee children from Spain.

Since the end of World War II the IFM-SEI organises international camps as well as encouraging bi- and multi-lateral camps between members. The following is a list of official IFM-SEI camps held since 1945:
 1946 Brighton,
 1951 Döbriach, 
 1952 Füssen,
 1955 Oslo,
 1956 Stockholm,
 1958 Vienna,
 1961 Deurne,
 1965 Reinwarzhofen,
 1967 Scunthorpe,
 1971 Lahti,
 1974 Döbriach,
 1977 Oslo,
 1981 Walsrode,
 1985 Döbriach,
 1988 Imatra,
 1991 Norrköping,
 1994 Reinwarzhofen,
 1997 Zanka, 
 2000 Döbriach, . Theme: Children's Rights. 1000 participants.
 2006 Kent. Theme: Millennium Development Goals. 5000 participants.
 2010 Döbriach, and Jedovnice,. Theme: Train 4 Change. 1000 participants.
 2016 Reinwarzhofen,. Theme: Welcome to Another World.
 2022 Northamptonshire, . Theme: Common Ground – International Friendship and Solidarity. Originally planned for 2020 it was postponed due to the Covid epidemic.

Member organisations 
Member and candidate organisations are listed here:

Africa

 Girls Excel
 Youth Advocates Ghana
 Oyoun Masr Association
 Pionniers du Mali
 Action Enfance Senegal
 Mouvement National des Pionniers Senegalais
 Union Youth Saguiet el-Hamra and Rio de Oro
 Patsimederu Trust

Asia 

 Antar Bharati
 KKSP Foundation
 Youth Organization of Bhutan (exile in Nepal)

Europe 

 Armenian Youth Federation (ARF-YO)
 Kinderfreunde /  Rote Falken
 SYB - The Falcons Belarus, Belarus (in exile in Lithuania)

 Faucons Rouges
 Rode Valken, RVPA
 Pionýr
 DUI - Leg og Virke
 Nuorten Kotkain Keskusliitto
 Georgian Falcons
 Sozialistische Jugend Deutschlands-Die Falken
 Hungarian Childfriends
 Arciragazzi
 Lietuvos Sakaliuku sajunga
Framfylkingen
 Fenix
 Slovenian Falcons
 Esplais Catalans
 Kinderfreunde / Rote Falken
 Woodcraft Folk

Middle East 

 Hashomer Hatzair
 HaNoar HaOved VeHaLomed
 Ajyal
 Independence Youth Union
 Independent Youth Forum
 Seeds Association for Development and Culture 'Bothoor'
 Association for Social Democracy

Latin America 

 Organizacion Nueva Generacion
 Manque Chile
 Agrupacion Integridad Absoluta
 Movimiento Infantil Luis Alfonso Velásquez Flores (MILAVF)
 Los Cachorros
 Club infantil CHAP "Mayo 23"
 Mundo Nuevo
 Juventud País Solidario (JPS)

References

External links 
 

 01
Children's rights organizations
Socialist education
International nongovernmental youth organizations
Youth-led organizations
Youth organisations based in Belgium
Youth wings of social democratic parties
Youth organizations established in 1922
1922 establishments in Europe
Youth movements